Stian Rokås Michalsen (born 28 March 1997) is a Norwegian footballer who plays as a winger for Egersund.

Career
Michalsen made his league debut for Viking as a substitute against Start in October 2016.

In August 2018, he signed for 2. divisjon club Arendal. On 1 March 2021, he moved on to fellow 2. divisjon club Egersund.

Career statistics

References

1996 births
Living people
Sportspeople from Stavanger
Norwegian footballers
Viking FK players
Sola FK players
Ljungskile SK players
Arendal Fotball players
Egersunds IK players
Eliteserien players
Norwegian First Division players
Ettan Fotboll players
Norwegian Second Division players
Association football midfielders
Norwegian expatriate footballers
Expatriate footballers in Sweden
Norwegian expatriate sportspeople in Sweden
Norway youth international footballers